Nouha Landoulsi (born ) is a Tunisian weightlifter, competing in the 53 kg category and represented Tunisia at international competitions.

Career 

She won the bronze medal at the 2014 Summer Youth Olympics. She was first at the 2016 African Weightlifting Championships.

In 2018, she won the silver medal in the women's 58 kg event at the Junior World Weightlifting Championships held in Tashkent, Uzbekistan. In 2019, she competed in the women's 55 kg event at the 2019 World Weightlifting Championships held in Pattaya, Thailand.

In 2020, she won the bronze medal in the women's 55kg event at the Roma 2020 World Cup in Rome, Italy.

She represented Tunisia at the 2020 Summer Olympics in Tokyo, Japan. She competed in the women's 55 kg event.

Major results

References

External links
http://www.mediterraneanweightlifting.it/statistics/medrecords_youth.pdf
http://www.iwrp.net/component/cwyniki/?view=contestant&id_zawodnik=20474
http://www.iwf.net/2014/08/18/thailands-and-prks-outstanding-victory/
http://www.bangkokpost.com/print/427511/

1998 births
Living people
Tunisian female weightlifters
Place of birth missing (living people)
Weightlifters at the 2014 Summer Youth Olympics 
Mediterranean Games silver medalists for Tunisia
Mediterranean Games medalists in weightlifting
Competitors at the 2018 Mediterranean Games
Weightlifters at the 2020 Summer Olympics
Olympic weightlifters of Tunisia
21st-century Tunisian women